Alexander Thomas Harry Buesnel (born 8 October 1992) is a British artistic gymnast. He is a ten-time British Disability Gymnastics Champion as well as a Gold medalist in the 2011 Special Olympics World Summer Games in Athens, Greece. He was born in Jersey, Channel Islands, and started his gymnastics career in 2004 under the watchful eye of Jersey Special Gymnastics Club founder John Grady . Since 2004, Buesnel has competed in competitions across the globe representing both Jersey and Great Britain in National, European and World championships. One of his favourite skill elements is the 'Russian Lever'.

Early life 
Alexander Thomas Harry Buesnel was born in Saint Helier, Jersey on 8 October 1992. Alex was introduced to Gymnastics in September 2004 when Buesnel joined the Jersey Special Gymnastics Club aged 11. In 2005, he competed in his first mainland competition in Poole where he won three Gold medals at Level 1 and a further Gold on vault at Level 2. He repeated his achievements in 2006 and 2007, taking three Gold medals at both Level 2 and 3 in the next two consecutive years. Progressing through the set levels, Buesnel moved up to Level 4 (the highest tier) in 2008.

In 2007, he won the Alan Kelly Memorial Trophy for achievement in Special Gymnastics in Jersey. A feat he repeated in December 2017, 10 years after first winning the award.

Senior career

2008 
2008 was an important year for Alex Buesnel. The Jerseyman was selected for the Great Britain team in August 2008. Alex moved up to Level 4 - the highest level of Special Gymnastics. In November 2008, Buesnel lifted his first British Open title in London - the first ever Jersey Special Gymnast to do so.

Shortly after his first title, the Channel Islander was invited to his first event outside the British Isles - the Blume Festival in Gran Canaria. This trip included training camps, displays and a friendly competition at the end of the week long experience.

2009 
A busy second year at senior level for Buesnel saw him contest his first Special Olympics National Games in Leicester. Five Gold's, one Silver and a fourth on horizontal bar propelled him to the All-Round Gold medal. This was backed-up with his second British Open title - this time secured in Newcastle.

Alex travelled to Berlin, Germany for his second international training camp with the Great Britain squad.

2010 
Buesnel commenced foundation coaching as part of his Sport course at Highlands College as well his Gymnastics career.

2011 
As well as scooping his fourth British title in Poole, Buesnel was named in the Great Britain squad for the upcoming Special Olympics World Games in Athens, Greece. Alex brought home a Gold medal on the Floor as well as Silver on the Rings, Parallel Bars, Horizontal Bar and Bronze on the Vault which sealed a hard-fought overall All-Round Bronze medal at his first Olympic Games.

Away from competition, Buesnel went about becoming a coach and in November 2011 he passed his Level 1 Coaching assessment.

2012 
Buesnel reached an important milestone in November 2012 when the Channel Islander claimed five straight British Open titles. A week later Alex was recognised for his British success when he was awarded the Jersey Sports Association For The Disabled (JSAD) Sports Personality of the Year.

As one of Jersey's most decorated sportsmen, Alex  was selected as one of the 20 Flame carriers when he took part in the London 2012 Olympic torch relay in St Helier, Jersey in July 2012

2013 
In his second Special Olympics National Games in Bath, Buesnel chalked-up more medals. Six Gold's and a Silver propelled him to the top step, claiming the all-round Gold. Buesnel was also awarded another Gold medal in a special gala event to close the competition.

2014 
Buesnel contested his first Special Olympics European Games in Antwerp, Belgium. Before the competition Buesnel along with his fellow athletes enjoyed a special reception with Prime Minister David Cameron. At the competition, Alex claimed three Gold's, three Silver and a Bronze - a strong showing for the Jerseyman and was just pipped to the All-Round Gold.

As well as his European success Alex excelled in Britain. In March 2014, Disability Gymnasts' profile was raised when the sport was run alongside the British Gymnastics Championships at Echo Arena in Liverpool. Alex won the Disability All-Round Gold while sharing the arena with Olympic greats including Louis Smith MBE and Daniel Keatings.

2015 
In March 2015, Alex competed in his second British Masters competition at the Echo Arena in Liverpool claiming four Gold and two Silver medals. Buesnel's domination of the British Open Championship also continued with Gold All-Round on his way to his eighth straight British title winning all pieces of apparatus.

Another of his achievement's in 2015 was to take two Silver medals and a Bronze for Jersey in the mainstream Inter Island Games in Anglesey, Wales in 2015.

2016 
As well as his ninth British Open success, 2016 saw Buesnel become an ambassador for British Gymnastics, the governing body for gymnastics in the United Kingdom. The Channel Islander also passed his Level 2 Coaching assessment.

2017 
In the summer of 2017, Buesnel contested his third Special Olympics National Games in Sheffield and thrived in competition as he was awarded seven Gold medals. Alex was chosen to perform his Horizontal Bar routine at a special gala performance to close the competition.

2017 was a breakthrough year for Buesnel as he was selected for the 13-strong squad to represent Jersey in the Natwest Island Games in Gotland that year. The Jerseyman was the first disabled athlete to represent the island in the biennial games. As well as helping the team collect Silver, Buesnel also qualified for two finals to compete for individual medal honours - but just missed out on a rostrum position.

In September, Alex was shortlisted as finalist for the Jersey Evening Post Pride of Jersey Awards.

To round off a successful 2017, Buesnel lifted his tenth consecutive British Open Championship title, laying the foundations for a decade of dominance. Buesnel also was awarded the JSAD Sports Personality of the Year for the second time.

2018 
At the beginning of 2018 Alex was recognised for his services to Gymnastics in the Channel Islands and was awarded the Michael Lucas Sporting Hero Award at the Betway Channel Islands Sports Personality Awards in Guernsey. 

In March, Buesnel made the shortlist for the 2017 Jersey Sports Council Sports Personality of the Year.  After missing out on the main trophy, the gymnast won an award for achievement in Disability sport. 

In the same month Alex competed in his final competition, the British Masters competition at the Echo Arena in Liverpool - walking away with three Gold and two Silver medals.

Retirement 
On the Tuesday 20 March 2018 Alex Buesnel announced his retirement from competitive gymnastics after 14 years in the sport. The Jerseyman will continue to train and will now focus on his coaching career - inspiring the next generation of gymnasts.

Honours 
 10-time British Open Gymnastics Champion
 Special Olympics Gold Medalist
 British Gymnastics Ambassador 
 JSAD Sports Personality of the Year (2012 and 2017)
 JSAD Special Merit Award (2009 and 2016)
 Michael Lucas Sporting Hero Award - Channel Islands Sports Personality Awards 2017

References

1992 births
British male artistic gymnasts
Jersey people
Living people
Sportspeople with autism